Mount Nancy, formerly Mount Amorisgelu, is a mountain located in Grafton County, New Hampshire, on the eastern boundary of the Pemigewasset Wilderness of the White Mountains. The mountain is the highest point and namesake of the Nancy Range.  
Mt. Nancy is flanked to the northeast by Mount Bemis, to the southwest by Mount Anderson, and to the southeast by Duck Pond Mountain. Although Mount Nancy is officially trailless, a visible path climbs to the summit from Norcross Pond.

The southwest face of Mount Nancy drains into Norcross Brook, thence into the East Branch of the Pemigewasset River, the Merrimack River, and into the Gulf of Maine at Newburyport, Massachusetts. The northwest side of Mt. Nancy drains into Anderson Brook, and thence into Norcross Brook. The northeast and southeast sides of Mt. Nancy drain into Nancy Brook, thence into the Saco River, and into the Gulf of Maine at Saco, Maine.

The legend of Nancy

See also 

 List of mountains in New Hampshire
 White Mountain National Forest
 New England Hundred Highest

References 

Mountains of New Hampshire
Mountains of Grafton County, New Hampshire
New England Hundred Highest